Hermann Pagenstecher (September 16, 1844 – December 31, 1932) was a German ophthalmologist born in Langenschwalbach.

In 1867 he obtained his doctorate from the University of Würzburg, and shortly afterwards was an assistant at the internal medicine clinic in Greifswald (1867-68). Later he studied with ophthalmologist Albrecht von Graefe (1828-1870) in Berlin, then subsequently took an extended scientific trip to London, Edinburgh and Paris.

After returning to Germany, he worked with his older brother, Alexander Pagenstecher (1828-1879), at the latter's eye clinic in Wiesbaden. After the untimely death of his brother in 1879, he took charge of the Wiesbaden eye clinic. In 1890 he became a professor of ophthalmology.

On May 7, 1899 he visited Queen Victoria at Windsor Castle to examine her eyesight. In her private journal she wrote:

"Professor Pagenstecher, the famous German occulist, who is staying at Cumberland Lodge. He said he found my eyes no worse, in fact rather better, which is a great encouragement."

Pagenstecher is remembered for advancing his brother's pioneer work with intracapsular cataract extraction, of which he described in the monograph Die Operation des grauen Stars in geschlossener Kapsel. With Carl Genth (1844-1904), he was co-author of Atlas der pathologischen Anatomie des Augapfels (Atlas of the Pathological Anatomy of the Eyeball), a book that was later translated into English by neurologist William Richard Gowers (1845-1915).

References

External links 
 Zeno.org translated biography @ Pagel: Biographical Dictionary
 The Bernard Becker Collection in Ophthalmology

1844 births
1932 deaths
People from Bad Schwalbach
German ophthalmologists
University of Würzburg alumni